The modern Tatar languages are:

 the Tatar language of European Russia
 the Mishar Tatar dialect
 the Old Tatar language, its parent language
 the Crimean Tatar language of Crimea
 the Siberian Tatar language of Siberia, Russia
 the Baraba dialect

See also
 Tartary